John O'Goband, a priest in the Diocese of Kilmore, was appointed Dean of Armagh in 1398, and served until 1406

References

Deans of Armagh
14th-century Irish Roman Catholic priests
15th-century Irish Roman Catholic priests